is a Japanese costume designer.
He was nominated for Best Costume Design at the Asian Film Awards for the 2010 samurai action film 13 Assassins. In addition to film, he has also designed costumes for television dramas and commercials. His work on Gakuryu Ishii's Mitsu no Aware was noted for its red color scheme. He also produced and designed the "Dammy" fashion brand.

Filmography 
 Crows Zero (2007)
 God's Puzzle (2008)
 Crows Zero 2 (2009)
 Tajomaru (2009) costume design for Shun Oguri
 13 assassins (2010)
 Seiji: Riku no Sakana (2012)
 Yusha Yoshihiko (TV Mini Series: Season 1 in 2011, Season 2 in 2012)
 Caught in the Web (2012)
 Rurouni Kenshin (2012)
 Flower of Shanidar (2013)
 Killers (2014)
 Joshi Zu (2014)
 Rurouni Kenshin 2: Kyoto Inferno (2014)
 Hot Road (2014)
 Rurouni Kenshin 3: The Legend Ends (2014)
 Soredake (2015)
 Shinjuku Swan (2015)
 The Whispering Star (2015)
 Lychee Light Club (2015)
 Nobunaga Concerto: The Movie (2016)
 Mitsu No Aware (2016)
 Himitsu (2016)
 Museum (2016)

References

External links

Japanese costume designers
Living people
Year of birth missing (living people)